Radio enjoys a huge following in the United Kingdom. There are around 600 licensed radio stations in the country. For a more comprehensive list see List of radio stations in the United Kingdom.

BBC Radio

The most prominent stations are the national networks operated by the BBC. Five of them are available on analogue radio (FM and AM) whilst the rest are available on DAB, along with the other five (at 12B, the BBC National multiplex).

 BBC Radio 1 broadcasts contemporary pop and rock music output, including live sessions, for a youth audience, with specialist genres and programmes in the evening (FM 97.1 - 99.8 MHz)
 BBC Radio 1Xtra broadcasts hip hop, R&B and drum and bass, featuring simulcasts on Radio 1 weeknights and Saturday nights
 BBC Radio 2 is the UK's most listened-to radio station, playing classic and contemporary music for an older audience, as well as special interest programmes in the evening (FM 88.1 - 90.2 MHz)
 BBC Radio 3 is a classical music station, broadcasting concerts and operas. At night, it transmits a wide range of jazz, world music and radio dramas (FM 90.2 - 92.6 MHz)
 BBC Radio 4 is a current affairs and speech station, with news, debate and radio dramas. It broadcasts the daily radio soap The Archers, as well as flagship news programmes Today and The World at One (FM 92.5 - 94.6 MHz, FM 103.6 – 104.9 MHz, AM 198 kHz, and various on MW)
 BBC Radio 4 Extra broadcasts comedy, drama and shows which extend or supplement popular programmes on its sister station, Radio 4, including The Archers spin off Ambridge Extra and archived episodes of Desert Island Discs
 BBC Radio 5 Live broadcasts live news and sports commentary with phone-in debates and studio guests (AM 693 kHz, 909 kHz, and 990 kHz)
 BBC Radio 5 Sports Extra is a companion to 5 Live for additional events coverage
 BBC Radio 6 Music transmits predominantly alternative music, with many live sessions
 BBC Asian Network is aimed at the large British Asian community, playing music whilst also broadcasting news and current affairs
 BBC World Service broadcasts international news and current affairs
The BBC also provides 40 local radio services for England and the Channel Islands, as well as stations from Scotland, Wales and Northern Ireland. All are available on FM and DAB and some are also available on AM.

Commercial radio

Also available nationally on analogue radio are three national commercial channels, namely Classic FM (FM 99.9 MHz—101.9 MHz); Absolute Radio (AM 1215 kHz); and talkSPORT (AM 1053 kHz or 1089 kHz in most areas). These stations are also available at 11D or 12A on DAB (on the Digital One multiplex). As with the BBC, digital radio has brought about many changes, including the roll-out of local stations such as Radio X, Kiss and Kerrang Radio to other areas of the United Kingdom.

Commercial radio licences are awarded by Ofcom, a government body which advertises a licence for an area and holds a so-called beauty contest to determine which station will be granted permission to broadcast in that area. Stations submit detailed application documents containing their proposed format and the outcome of research to determine the demand for their particular style of broadcast. Original 106 (Aberdeen) was the last radio station to be granted a licence by Ofcom.

Most local commercial stations in the United Kingdom broadcast to a city or group of towns within a radius of 20–50 miles, with a second tier of regional stations covering larger areas such as North West England. The predominant format is pop music, but many other tastes are also catered for, particularly in London and the larger cities, and on digital radio.

Rather than operating as independent entities, many local radio stations are owned by large radio groups which broadcast a similar format to many areas. The largest operator of radio is Global Radio which bought the former media group, GCap Media. It owns Classic FM and the Capital radio network. Other owners are Bauer Radio and Wireless Group, which mainly own stations that broadcast in highly populated city areas.

Many of these stations, including all the BBC stations, are also available via digital television services.

Community radio

Community radio stations broadcast to a small area, normally within a 3-mile (5 km) radius, and are required by the Act to be not-for-profit organisations, owned by local people, on which the broadcasters are mostly volunteers. They are recognised under the Communications Act 2003 as a distinct third tier of radio in the United Kingdom. The community radio movement in the United Kingdom was founded in the mid-1970s,   broadcasting through Restricted Service Licences, the internet and cable television.

An Access Radio pilot scheme, launched in 2002, gave fifteen stations, including Resonance FM and ALL FM, trial licences, and this has blossomed into a lively sector, overseen unofficially by the Community Media Association.

The broadcasters predominantly serve an easily defined racial community such as Asian Star Radio in Slough, or a geographically defined community such as Coast FM, Speysound Radio & The Bay Radio. They can also serve religious groups, such as Christian radio station Branch FM in Yorkshire. As well as this, they can also be linked with universities and student unions who run the stations under a community licence, for example Smoke Radio in London, Demon FM in Leicester, and Spark FM in Sunderland

Hospital radio
 Hospital radio
 List of hospital radio stations in the UK

Student radio
 Student radio

Radio publications
 Practical Wireless
 Radio Times
 Radio Today (website)
 RadCom

Statistics
According to RAJAR figures, the top ten stations or networks by listeners nationwide are:
BBC Radio 2 - 14.5 million
BBC Radio 4 - 10.6 million
Heart (network) - 8.4 million
BBC Radio 1 - 7.6 million
Capital (network) - 6.0 million
Hits Radio (network) - 5.7 million
BBC Radio 5 Live - 5.5 million
Smooth Radio (network) - 5.2 million
Absolute Radio (network) - 5.2 million
Classic FM - 5.1 million

In May 2022, figures published by Radio Joint Audience Research Limited (RAJAR) showed GB News Radio had received an average audience of 239,000 listeners in its first three months of broadcasting. RAJAR figures for the second quarter of 2022 showed the channel's listenership grew by a further 16%, to 277,000 listeners, making it the second-fastest-growing radio channel in the UK (behind the BBC World Service). Subsequently, between July and September 2022, GB News Radio's weekly audience grew by 50%, to 415,000. The Times and Press Gazette reported that it was the only news radio channel to rise during this period.

See also 
 British Wireless for the Blind Fund
 Broadcasting Act 1990
 Communications Act 2003
 Digital radio in the United Kingdom
 Independent Local Radio
 Independent National Radio
 List of radio stations in the United Kingdom
 Pirate radio in the United Kingdom
 Radio Academy
 Timeline of digital audio broadcasting in the UK
 Timeline of independent radio in the United Kingdom

References